"Eenie Meenie" is a song by American-Jamaican singer Sean Kingston and Canadian singer Justin Bieber. The song was written by both Kingston and Bieber along with Carlos Battey, Steven Battey, Marcos Palacios and Ernest Clark and Benny Blanco and was produced by the latter. It was originally released as the first single from Kingston's third studio album Back 2 Life on March 23, 2010, but was taken off for unknown reasons. However, it is included on Bieber's first studio album My World 2.0. The song, a dance-pop number with Kingston's reggae influences and Bieber's R&B vocals, is lyrically about an indecisive lover.

The song reached the top ten in the United Kingdom and New Zealand, and the top twenty in Australia, Canada, Ireland and the United States. The accompanying music video features Kingston and Bieber at a pool party at a condo, being pursued by the same girl.

Background and composition

The song premiered on March 4, 2010, on Ryan Seacrest's website, and it was released officially on March 23, 2010, in the United States. It is a dance-pop song, with R&B, and reggae fusion influences, written in the key of D major, with a vocal range from F3 to D5. It moves at 120 beats per minute and is set in common time. The song features a prominent synthesized back beat, followed by verses from both singers, then a rap interlude, while utilizing the children's rhyme "Eenie Meenie Miny Moe."

Critical reception
Kyle Anderson of MTV said that "'Eenie Meenie' melds Sean Kingston's island-inflected dance-pop with Bieber's sweet tween R&B." A reviewer of DJBooth said, "The record’s crown jewel, of course, is the chorus, which will worm its way into your head whether you like it or not." Although he called the song catchy, Chris Richards of The Washington Post said Kingston "hogs the mike" on the song. Rudy Klapper of Sputnikmusic wrote about the lyrics, on the album review, that those are "disturbing", but at the same time "unintentionally hilarious." She also criticized the production: "There's not much to say about the kind of producer who thinks the use of the term 'shorty' with an elementary school gimmick is a good idea." Luke O'Neil from The Boston Globe noted "Sultry reggaeton is repackaged here for the tween set with Sean Kingston's 'Eenie Meenie.' Shorty' was never sung so literally."

Chart performance
In the United States "Eenie Meenie" entered the Billboard Hot 100 at number thirty on April 7, 2010, where it was the highest debut of the week. The next week it dropped three places, and stayed there for another additional week. On the Billboard issue dated May 15, 2010, the single reached its peak, at number fifteen, and it was certified platinum by the Recording Industry Association of America.
As of February 2011, the single was sold 1,238,000 times.
In Australia, it debuted at number forty-nine within the ARIA Top 50 Singles Chart on April 4, 2010, the next week, "Eenie Meenie" reached the number thirty, but it fell out the chart the following week. It re-entered at number forty-five on April 25, 2010, and reached its peak at number eleven on May 30, 2010, where it stayed for three weeks. Later it was certified as gold by the Australian Recording Industry Association. The song appeared in the UK Singles Chart on May 22, 2010, at number fifty-eight. The next week "Eenie Meenie" rose to number seventeen and peaked at number nine in the next two weeks.

In Ireland, it debuted at number forty-one in the Irish Singles Chart on April 15, 2010, and rose the number twelve on May 17, 2010. In the Canadian Hot 100 "Eenie Meenie" debuted and peaked at number fourteen, becoming the highest debut of the week. But in the next issue, the single became the biggest drop, falling to the number thirty-one. It was certified gold by the Canadian Recording Industry Association. In New Zealand it debuted at number thirteen on March 29, 2010, and in its eighth week the song peaked at number five. It also was certified gold by the Recording Industry Association of New Zealand.

Music video

The music video was filmed on March 30, 2010, in Beverly Hills, California, and was directed by Ray Kay, director of Bieber's "Baby" video. On the topic of choosing the lead girl, Kingston told MTV News, "I picked the main girl, basically, because Justin is 16 and I'm 20 years old, so it had to be a girl that fit the both of us, because in the video and song, she's trying to play the both of us. So there had to be a contrast. She fit it perfectly." Additionally, Kingston explained the plot of the video to Rap-Up, commenting, "The video is basically about this girl trying to play both of us and at the end... we end up both at the same place at one time, and she's left with a stupid look on her face." Appearances are made by Bieber's friend, Christian Beadles, as well as rapper Lil Romeo and singer/actress Jasmine Villegas, whose appearance further fuelled media speculation Villegas and Bieber were romantically involved after a previous appearance in his music video for 'Baby'. Jocelyn Vena of MTV News reviewed the video, "Here's the play-by-play: While Kingston and the lady in question are flirting out on the deck, Bieber is chilling inside. But, wait — there she is flirting with Bieber while Kingston is hanging out, wondering where she went. The fickle girl eventually leaves Bieber to chill with Kingston, and then — boom — there she is with Bieber again. And, well, you get it. Of course, the 'eenie-meenie-miny-moe lover' eventually gets caught. While she's chatting up Kingston, along comes Bieber, and her game is blown. The dudes are cool with it. Well, they're not cool with her playing them, but they seem to remain friends despite both going for the same girl." As of August 2022, the music video on YouTube has over 558 million views.

Track listing

Credits and personnel
Songwriting - Kisean Anderson, Justin Bieber, Benjamin Levin, Carlos Battey, Steven Battey, Marcos Palacios, Ernest Clark
Production -  Benny Blanco
Drums, keyboards, and programming - Benny Blanco
Background vocals - Carlos Battey, Steven Battey
Engineering - Benny Blanco, Sam Holland
Vocal production and recording - Thaddis Harrell (Bieber's vocals), assisted by Travis Harrington
Vocal production - Greg Ogan, Steve Siravo
Production Coordination - Jeremy Levin, Todd Rubenstein, assisted by B. Cough and Dooey
Mixing - Serban Ghenea, engineered for mix by John Hanes, assisted by Tim Roberts
Editing - Matt Beckley, assisted by Jimmy James
Recorded at the King of Kings Studio, Miami, Florida
Source:

Charts

Weekly charts

Year-end charts

Certifications

Release history

References

External links
"Eenie Meenie" at Official Sean Kingston Website
 Official music video

2010 singles
Sean Kingston songs
Justin Bieber songs
Songs written by Benny Blanco
Songs written by Carlos Battey
Songs written by Steven Battey
Song recordings produced by Benny Blanco
Songs written by Sean Kingston
Music videos directed by Ray Kay
Male vocal duets
Songs based on children's songs
Songs written by Justin Bieber
2009 songs
Epic Records singles
Songs containing the I–V-vi-IV progression
Island Records singles